Edward Thomas Smith (28 May 1887 – 6 May 1960) was an Australian rules footballer who played with St Kilda in the Victorian Football League (VFL).

Notes

External links 

1887 births
1960 deaths
Australian rules footballers from Victoria (Australia)
St Kilda Football Club players
Prahran Football Club players